Henry, Holy Roman Emperor may refer to:
Henry the Fowler (876 – 936), duke of Saxony from 912 and king of the Germans from 919 until his death
Henry II, Holy Roman Emperor (973 – 1024), the Holy or the Saint, 5th and last Holy Roman Emperor of the Ottonian dynasty; King of Germany and King of Italy
Henry III, Holy Roman Emperor (1017–1056), the Black or the Pious, member of the Salian Dynasty of Holy Roman Emperors
Henry IV, Holy Roman Emperor (1050–1106), King of Germany and Holy Roman Emperor
Henry V, Holy Roman Emperor  (1086–1125), King of Germany and Holy Roman Emperor; fourth and last ruler of the Salian dynasty
Henry VI, Holy Roman Emperor (1165–1197), King of Germany, Holy Roman Emperor and King of Sicily
Henry (VII) of Germany (1211–1242), King of Sicily, King of Germany and Duke of Swabia
Henry VII, Holy Roman Emperor, Holy Roman Emperor